Dame Christine Braddock, DBE, DL is a British further education administrator, academic and was High Sheriff of the West Midlands for the year 2013-2014.

Early life
Christine Braddock was born in Burnley, Lancashire, where she attended Towneley High School (then Burnley Technical High School) and later went to Newcastle University. Going on to graduate from Birmingham University with a BPhilEd in Education in 1989.

Career
She is currently chairman of Birmingham Children’s Hospital NHS Foundation Trust.

Until 2014 she was the Principal and Chief Executive of Birmingham Metropolitan College. She previously ran prison education for the Home Office in the Midlands.

Braddock was appointed as the new chairman of Birmingham Children's Hospital beginning in 2015. She is a past President of the Birmingham Chamber of Commerce and was the first public sector representative in its history to be nominated for the Presidency.

Appointments
She was appointed High Sheriff of the West Midlands in March 2013. She was awarded an honorary DUniv degree by Birmingham University in 2013.

Honours
Braddock was appointed a Dame Commander of the Order of the British Empire (DBE) for services to Further Education in the 2013 New Year Honours. She had formerly been appointed a Commander of the Order of the British Empire (CBE).

References

External links
 Birmingham Metropolitan College profile, bmetc.ac.uk; accessed 9 February 2015.

Alumni of the University of Birmingham
Living people
Dames Commander of the Order of the British Empire
Deputy Lieutenants of the West Midlands (county)
People from Burnley
British academics
English educators
High Sheriffs of the West Midlands
Year of birth missing (living people)
Place of birth missing (living people)